O'Fallon is a city located along Interstates 64 and 70 between Lake St. Louis and St. Peters in St. Charles County, Missouri, United States. It is part of the St. Louis metropolitan statistical area. As of the 2020 census, O'Fallon had a population of 91,316, making it the largest suburb of St. Louis, as well as the largest municipality in St. Charles County and the seventh-largest in Missouri. O'Fallon's namesake in St. Clair County, Illinois, is also part of the St. Louis metropolitan statistical area. The two O'Fallons are one of the few pairs of same-named municipalities to be part of the same MSA.

History
O'Fallon was founded in 1856 by Nicholas Krekel. The community was named by Krekel's older brother, Judge Arnold Krekel, after John O'Fallon, the president of the North Missouri Railroad. A post office called O'Fallon has been in operation since 1859 with its first postmaster being Nicholas Krekel. The St. Mary's Institute of O'Fallon was listed on the National Register of Historic Places in 2007.

In 2006, Money magazine named O'Fallon 39th in its "Best 100 Places to Live". The magazine also ranked O'Fallon 68th out of 100 in 2008, 26th out of 100 in 2010, and 42nd out of 100 in 2017.

Geography

Demographics

2010 census
As of the census of 2010,  79,329 people, 28,234 households, and 21,436 families were residing in the city. The 29,376 housing units averaged . The racial makeup of the city was 89.9% White, 4.0% African American, 0.2% Native American, 3.2% Asian, 0.9% from other races, and 1.8% from two or more races. Hispanics or Latinos of any race were 2.7% of the population.

Of the 28,234 households, 44.7% had children under 18 living with them, 61.6% were married couples living together, 10.0% had a female householder with no husband present, 4.3% had a male householder with no wife present, and 24.1% were not families. About 19.3% of all households were made up of individuals, and 6.2% had someone living alone who was 65 or older. The average household size was 2.80, and the average family size was 3.23.

The median age in the city was 34.3 years. The age distribution of the city was 30% under 18; 7.1% between 18 and 24; 30.8% from 25 to 44; 23.1% from 45 to 64; and 8.9% at 65 or older. The gender makeup of the city was 48.8% male and 51.2% female.

Economy
Mastercard has a major presence in O'Fallon. Venture Stores was headquartered and maintained a distribution center in O'Fallon, until its dissolution. The buildings are now occupied by  True Manufacturing.  Air Evac Lifeteam, a medical helicopter service for the rural areas of the Ozarks, moved its headquarters to O'Fallon in 2015.

Sports
O'Fallon was the home of the River City Rascals independent Frontier League baseball team.  The Rascals played at CarShield Field in O'Fallon, which was built in 1999. It is located on Tom Ginnever Boulevard and T.R. Hughes Boulevard near downtown. The organization ceased operations after the 2019 season. The O'Fallon Hoots and the CarShield Collegiate League now play at the stadium.

Parks and recreation
 Civic Park,  a  park, it features Alligator's Creek Aquatic Center, a bandstand and amphitheater.
 Dames Park is a  sports park with three football fields and a fitness course.
 Fort Zumwalt Park is a  park featuring a fishing lake, a disc golf course, playgrounds, and historic Fort Zumwalt.
 Knaust Park is a  park with a playground and walking path.
 O'Fallon Sports Park is a  soccer complex with 12 fields, playgrounds, and concessions. It is also home to the Renaud Spirit Center.
 Ozzie Smith Sports Complex is a  baseball/softball complex with seven diamonds, adjacent to CarShield Field.
 Westhoff Park is a  park featuring baseball diamonds, sand volleyball courts, horseshoe pits, basketball courts, tennis and handball courts, and a skate park.

Climate
O'Fallon has a humid subtropical climate (Köppen Cfa). Summers are hot and humid, while winters are moderately cold.

Government
O'Fallon operates under a charter form of government. The mayor serves four-year terms without term limits and is also the President of the City Council. The 10-member council consists of two members from each of the five wards; the council had 8 members until the fifth ward was created in 2010. City council members served two-year terms until 2010, when they switched to three-year terms. The council elects a President Pro Tempore from among its members, who presides over the council in the mayor's absence.

Bill Hennessy has served as mayor since 2009. The most senior member of the council is Debbie Cook, who was elected to a Ward 5 seat in a 2014 special election and was re-elected in 2016, 2019, and 2022. In January 2022, city councilwoman Katie Gatewood became the first elected official in O'Fallon to be impeached and removed from office. She was accused of impeding the duties of the police chief and lying to the Council about the identity of a whistleblower.

As of January 2023, there is one vacancy on the council: Ward 1 councilman and President Pro Tem Dave Hinman resigned after being elected to the Missouri House of Representatives. Ward 2 councilman Tom Herweck succeeded him as President Pro Tem.

Education and libraries
O'Fallon is served mostly by the Fort Zumwalt School District, and the westernmost part is served by the Wentzville R-IV School District. The south to southeastern part of the city is served by the Francis Howell R-III School District. St. Dominic High School is a private Catholic school located in O'Fallon; Christian High School is a nondenominational Christian secondary school also located in O'Fallon. Satellite campuses of Webster University and Lindenwood University are located in O'Fallon.

O'Fallon is served by the St. Charles City-County Library system, which has three branches in the area, two standard (Deer Run and Middendorf-Kredell) and one "express" location (Library Express at Winghaven).

Infrastructure
While the City is within the jurisdiction of multiple agencies, fire protection is mostly provided by the O'Fallon Fire Protection District, which in 2007 became the first internationally accredited fire agency in Missouri. The award was made by the Center for Public Safety Excellence's Commission on Fire Accreditation International, which has approved accreditation status for only 120 fire agencies worldwide.

The western portion of the city is served by the Wentzville Fire Protection District.
The eastern portion of the city is served by Central County Fire Rescue. 
The southern portion of the city is served by the Cottleville Fire Protection District
The far southwestern portion of the city is served by the New Melle Fire District
An extremely small portion of the city is served by the Lake Saint Louis Fire District

Notable people
Napheesa Collier (September 23, 1996), Minnesota Lynx forward, 2019 WNBA Rookie of the Year
Harry Gilmer (April 14, 1926 – August 20, 2016), All-American college and Pro Bowl football player and former head coach of the Detroit Lions
Nathan Heald (September 24, 1775 – April 27, 1832), U.S. Army officer during the War of 1812, in command of Fort Dearborn in Chicago
Megan Taylor Meier (November 6, 1992 — October 17, 2006), teenager known for circumstances of death
Josh Sargent (February 20, 2000), forward for Norwich City and United States men's national soccer team
Tim Ream (October 5, 1987), defender for Fulham FC and United States men's national soccer team
Pamela Hupp - Murderer

References

External links
 City of O'Fallon
 O'Fallon Fire Protection District
 Historic maps of O'Fallon in the Sanborn Maps of Missouri Collection at the University of Missouri

Cities in St. Charles County, Missouri
Populated places established in 1856
Cities in Missouri
1856 establishments in Missouri